Terminal Hotel may refer to:

Terminal Hotel (Atlanta), a demolished building in Atlanta
Terminal Hotel (Little Rock, Arkansas), a historic property in Little Rock, Arkansas
Terminal Hotel, a historic hotel in Meridian, Mississippi